Charles Raymond "Chick" McIlroy (born August 1, 1938) is an American water polo player who competed in the 1960 Summer Olympics and in the 1964 Summer Olympics.

He was born in Minot, North Dakota, and moved with his family to El Segundo, California when he was 1 years old. Charles was one of ten kids born to Kennith McIlroy and Helen (Vadnais) McIlroy. He was the fifth son of eight boys, having two sisters. 

McIlroy swam and played waterpolo at El Segundo High School for the legendary coach Uro Saari.  after High School. Charles swam and played waterpolo at El Camino Jr Collage before transferring to   California State University, Long Beach.

McIlroy was a member of the American water polo team which finished seventh in the [[Water polo at the 1960 Summer Olympics In Rome.

Four years later at the 1964 Olympics in Tokyo, the United States team was eliminated in the first round.  1964 Olympic tournament. He played three matches. Of special note, Charles's two brothers, Paul McIlroy and Ned McIlroy were also on the 1964 U.S. waterpolo team. 

In 2008 at the age of 70, Charles was a member of the Tri Valley Waterpolo Club that competed in the World Masters Waterpolo Tournament in Perth Australia. The team Charles played on, won all eight of their games in the 60+ division, earning them the gold medal in their age group.  Charles played in every game. 

In 1980, he was inducted into the USA Water Polo Hall of Fame.

References

External links
 

1938 births
Living people
American male water polo players
Long Beach State Beach men's water polo players
Olympic water polo players of the United States
Water polo players at the 1960 Summer Olympics
Water polo players at the 1964 Summer Olympics